Chris Croucher (born 1 August 1981) is an English screenwriter and producer.

Biography
Chris Croucher is a TV drama producer and writer based in the UK.

He earned a BA in Film Production, graduating in 2003.

After graduating, he worked as an assistant director on films and shows such as Downton Abbey, Little Dorrit, Sense and Sensibility, Wimbledon, Hitchhikers Guide to the Galaxy, Magicians, Brick Lane and 28 Weeks Later.

In 2008, he directed the short film The Beachcombers, which was funded by Film London via The Lewisham Film Initiative and co-written with Mark Beynon. The romantic short starred Charity Wakefield and Rasmus Hardiker. The film went on to win the Film London & ITV 'Best of Borough Award 2008' presented at BAFTA.

His second short film, In Passing, was a 1940s drama starring Lesley Sharp, Russell Tovey and Sean Pertwee.

In 2011, he wrote and produced the short film Friend Request Pending, a comedy-drama starring Judi Dench, Penny Ryder, Philip Jackson, John Macmillan and Tom Hiddleston. The film premiered at the BFI London Film Festival in October 2011.

In 2014/15, Croucher was series producer for seasons 5 and 6 of Downton Abbey. He received two Emmy nominations and won the NTA award for Best Drama twice.

Croucher produced 'The Halcyon' in 2016, an eight-part TV period drama for Sony & Left Bank Pictures.

He produced the Netflix series 'The Innocents' in 2017/18, followed by 'White Lines' in 2019/20, a Netflix series written by Alex Pina (Money Heist) and made by Left Bank Pictures (The Crown).

Sexual Assault
 
Chris Croucher pleaded guilty to an offence of sexual assault that occurred in December 2019 after he inappropriately touched a woman during an office Christmas party. Later, in June 2021, The Guardian published an in-depth report of the timeline of events relating to the assault under the headline 'Bafta-winning TV firm accused of mishandling sexual assault complaint' after two freelance colleagues waived their right to anonymity as victims of sexual assault.

Filmography

Writer

Assistant director

References

External links 
 
 Official website

English screenwriters
English male screenwriters
English television directors
English film directors
1981 births
Living people